"Love You Like I Did" is the third single from R&B group 112 from their 1998 album, Room 112.

Daron leads the song with Slim leading on the bridge.

Charts

Weekly charts

References 

1999 singles
112 (band) songs
Music videos directed by Marcus Raboy
Bad Boy Records singles
Songs written by Sean Combs
1998 songs